Coleophora vacciniivorella is a moth of the family Coleophoridae. It is found in North America.

The larvae feed on the leaves of Vaccinium species. They create a composite leaf case.

References

vacciniivorella
Moths of North America
Moths described in 1955